Dominique Garde (born 18 March 1959) is a former French racing cyclist. He rode in thirteen Grand Tours between 1982 and 1991.

References

External links
 

1959 births
Living people
People from Condrieu
French male cyclists
Sportspeople from Rhône (department)
Cyclists from Auvergne-Rhône-Alpes